René Carcan (25 May 1925 – 1993) was a prominent Belgian engraver and sculptor, who studied under Léon Devos, Jacques Maes and Johnny Friedlaender. His works have been shown in numerous international exhibitions including Galerie La Proue, and are closely associated with the work of Graciela Rodo Boulanger, who was also in the Friedlaender school.

Life
Carcan was born in Saint-Josse-ten-Noode and died in Etterbeek, Belgium. He studied at the Académie Royale des Beaux-Arts and Saint-Josse-ten-Noode. His main sculpting study was under D. Jacobs.

He developed an artistic style which has been compared to Henri Matisse's, of distilling a vision to an essential essence. His use of colour was influenced by Wassily Kandinsky and by Paul Klee.

A museum was established in Brussels at the site of Carcan's old studio, the Fondation René Carcan (Rue Champ-de-Roi 122, Etterbeek), for the preservation and study of his life's works. This was both a museum and foundation, and exhibited works of his lithography, sculpting and jewellery design until it closed in 2006.

The Fondation René Carcan subsequently became the Espace René Carcan and established the "René Carcan International Prize for Printmaking", intended to encourage printmaking. The first edition of this biennial award took place in 2014.

References

Further reading
 Jürgen Weichert, René Carcan: Radierungen, Münster, Edition Schnake (1983) 
 P. Roberts-Jones René Carcan, Brussels, Les Editeurs d'Art Associes (1984)
 Philippe Cruysmans, Movement Generates Harmony, René Carcan (2005)

External links
Fondation René Carcan 
René Carcan Museum on opt.be

1925 births
1993 deaths
People from Saint-Josse-ten-Noode
Belgian engravers
20th-century Belgian sculptors
20th-century engravers